The 2002 Grand Prix Americas was the sixteenth round of the 2002 CART FedEx Champ Car World Series season, held on October 6, 2002 on the Bayfront Park street circuit in Miami, Florida.  Cristiano da Matta won the race and clinched the season championship.

Qualifying results

Race

Caution flags

Notes 

 New Track Record Tony Kanaan 1:01.264 (Qualifying Session #1)
 New Race Record Cristiano da Matta 2:07:09.003
 Average Speed 68.723 mph

References

External links
 Friday Qualifying Results
 Saturday Qualifying Results
 Race Results

Miami
Grand Prix Americas
Grand Prix Americas